The Alicanto is a mythological nocturnal bird of the desert of Atacama, pertaining to Chilean mythology. Legend says that the alicanto's wings shine at night with beautiful, metallic colors, and their eyes emit strange lights. The color of the wings may indicate the type of ore it eats, golden if from a gold mine and silvery if from a silver mine. Some descriptions also portray the color of the wings as copper-green.

The bird runs on the ground and can't fly because of the weight of the ore it eats, this means that it runs faster if it hasn't eaten recently. According to legend, a miner that follows an alicanto without being noticed by the bird can find rich mineral outcrops or treasures such as an entierro. But if the Alicanto discovers that it's being followed it will turn off the shining of its wings, and scuttle away in the darkness of the night. Also, if the miner is not of "good heart" the alicanto will guide the miner off a cliff. Accordingly, the miner will not be able to see the cliff in time because of the "intensity of the darkness". It is said that it was an alicanto that guided Juan Godoy to the rich silver outcrops of Chañarcillo on May 16, 1832, sparking the Chilean silver rush.

The account of the Alicanto of folklorist Julio Vicuña Cifuentes is mentioned in the Book of Imaginary Beings in the chapter "Fauna of Chile".

References

Chilean mythology
Legendary birds
Spanish-language South American legendary creatures
Mining folklore